Benito Salas may refer to:

Benito Salas Vargas (died 1816), Colombian patriot who fought in the Spanish reconquest of New Granada
Benito Salas Airport, an airport in Neiva, Colombia, named after Benito Salas Vargas